Smartisan Technology Co., Ltd., commonly known as Smartisan, is a Chinese multinational technology company headquartered in Beijing and Chengdu. It designs and markets consumer electronic devices and online services. Its hardware product line includes the Smartisan smartphone and the Smartisan earphone. Its consumer software include the Smartisan OS operating system. Its online services include the Smartisan Store, the Smartisan OS App Store and Smiling Cloud.

Smartisan was founded by Luo Yonghao on 28 May 2012, to develop and sell smartphones.

On 27 March 2013, Smartisan announced Smartisan OS, a smartphone platform based on the Android operating system. On 20 May 2014, Smartisan announced their first smartphone, the Smartisan T1. On 29 December 2015, Smartisan announced their second smartphone, the Smartisan T2.

Coming out with latest design and modest specifications, company launched Jianguo ahead of Smartisan T2 debut. Jianguo introduces Smartisan OS 2.0 version.

During 2016, 2017 and 2019, Smartisan was the lead financial contributor to the OpenBSD project.

Etymology
According to the company website, the English name "Smartisan" is a portmanteau of "smart" and "artisan", signifying "artisanship in the smartphone era."

Products

Smartphones

References

External links
  (Global)

Companies based in Beijing
Chinese companies established in 2012
Computer hardware companies
Mobile phone manufacturers
Privately held companies of China
Mobile phone companies of China
Electronics companies of China
Chinese brands
Electronics companies established in 2012